Philip Ridder (tr. Filipp Filippovich Ridder; born in 1759 in Saint Petersburg, Russian Empire - died in 1838 in Riga) was a Russian explorer of German descent who discovered polymetallic ores in north-eastern Kazakhstan.

A town in that region, Ridder, bore Philip Ridder's name from 1786 to 1941, when it was changed to Leninogorsk; however, in 2002, the name was reverted to Ridder. The town is notable as the eastern terminus of European route E40.

External links
Town of Leninogorsk, Kazakhstan to regain historic name - Ridder

1759 births
1838 deaths
Baltic German people from the Russian Empire
Russian people of German descent
Explorers from Saint Petersburg
Explorers of Central Asia